Lee Balkin (born June 7, 1961) is a retired American high jumper. He competed at the 1987 World Championships without reaching the final. His personal best jump is 2.33 metres, achieved in July 1987 in Durham.

Balkin holds the school record in the high jump at Glendale High School in Glendale, California.  On the outset that might not sound impressive, but the previous record was held by Dwight Stones, who was already a double Olympic medalist and the National High School Record holder.  At the 1979 CIF California State Meet, Balkin jumped 7' 3½" which is still the state meet record.

Balkin later attended the University of California, Los Angeles, where he again surpassed Stones and is the number two high jumper on the school's top ten list.

Even while still jumping competitively, Balkin started coaching jumpers as an assistant coach at Glendale Community College.  He remains there as both coach and teacher.

References

External links

photo

1961 births
Living people
American male high jumpers
UCLA Bruins men's track and field athletes
Track and field athletes from California
Athletes (track and field) at the 1987 Pan American Games
Pan American Games track and field athletes for the United States